Squareheads of the Round Table is a 1948 short subject directed by Edward Bernds starring American slapstick comedy team The Three Stooges (Moe Howard, Larry Fine and Shemp Howard). It is the 106th entry in the series released by Columbia Pictures starring the comedians, who released 190 shorts for the studio between 1934 and 1959.

Plot
The Stooges are troubadours in medieval times. The villainous Black Prince has designs on marriage to Elaine, the Princess Elaine. She however is in love with Cedric, the blacksmith. The Stooges try to intervene for Cedric by serenading Elaine; the music is the sextet from Gaetano Donizetti's opera "Lucia di Lammermoor". After breaking free from the dungeon where the good King Arthur Pendragon has condemned them to be beheaded, Moe overhears the Black Prince plotting with a co-conspirator to murder the king after he marries Princess Elaine and has her boyfriend's head so that he can become the new King of England. The Stooges save the day by causing a diversion by dancing in armor to Stephen Foster’s "Old Folks at Home", thus allowing Elaine to free Cedric. Finally, the king realizes the plot and jails the Black Prince and his fellow plotter. Elaine is allowed to marry Cedric, and they all live happily ever after.

Cast

Credited
 Shemp Howard as Shemp
 Larry Fine as Larry
 Moe Howard as Moe
 Christine McIntyre as Princess Elaine
 Jock Mahoney as Cedric the Blacksmith
 Philip Van Zandt as Black Prince 
 Vernon Dent as King Arthur

Uncredited
 Harold Brauer as Sir Satchel
 Joe Palma as Guard
 Robert Stevens as Guard
 Joe Garcio as Headsman
 Douglas Coppin as King's Personal Guard
 Judy Malcolm as Woman in King's Entourage

Production notes
Squareheads of the Round Table was the ninth Stooge film released but only the third one filmed after Shemp rejoined the comedy team. Filming occurred on December 9–12, 1946, but was withheld from release until March 1948, approximately 15 months later. It was filmed approximately five months after the last entry, Out West (1947), was filmed.

Squareheads of the Round Table was remade in 1954 as Knutzy Knights, using ample stock footage. Like  Fiddlers Three and The Hot Scots, Squareheads of the Round Table was filmed on the existing set of the feature film The Bandit of Sherwood Forest.

Quotes

King Arthur: "My daughter marry a ‘smith?!"
Shemp: "Take it easy, King; millions of women marry Smiths every year!"

References

External links 
 
 

1948 films
1948 comedy films
The Three Stooges films
American black-and-white films
Fiction set in Roman Britain
Arthurian films
Films directed by Edward Bernds
Columbia Pictures short films
American comedy short films
1940s English-language films
1940s American films